The Humanist Party is a universal humanist, progressive, and left-wing political party in Chile, founded in 1984. The party is a member of the Humanist International.

In December 1990, Laura Rodríguez became the first elected representative of any Humanist Party in the world after winning a seat as part of the Concertación coalition, after Augusto Pinochet handed over power.

At the 2001 legislative elections, the party won 1.1% of the vote but no seats.

For the 2005 presidential elections, the Humanist Party was a member of the coalition Juntos Podemos Más (Together We Can Do/Achieve More). Their presidential candidate Tomás Hirsch won 5.4% of the vote in a 4-way race between Michelle Bachelet, Sebastián Piñera, and Joaquín Lavín in the 2005 elections. He polled 4th place and therefore did not make the runoff.

On 12 March 2013 they selected economist and university professor Marcel Claude as their candidate for the 2013 presidential election.

Since 2017, the Humanist Party was part of the Broad Front, a new political coalition. Their presidential candidate was Beatriz Sánchez who won 20.3% of the votes, finishing in 3rd place; additionally, three deputies from the party were elected: Tomás Hirsch, Pamela Jiles and Florcita Alarcón.

The party was dissolved in February 2022 because it did not receive at least 5% of the votes in the 2021 parliamentary elections to maintain its legality. Its members in the Chamber of Deputies thereafter sat as independents.  In October 2022, the party was able to re-register in the Chilean electoral service.

Presidential candidates 
The following is a list of the presidential candidates and referendum options supported by the Humanist Party:
 1988 plebiscite: "No" (win)
 1989: Patricio Aylwin (win)
 1993: Cristián Reitze (lost; 5th place)
 1999: Tomás Hirsch (lost; 4th place)
 2005: Tomás Hirsch (lost; 4th place)
 2009: Marco Enríquez-Ominami (lost; 3rd place)
 2013: Marcel Claude (lost; 5th place)
 2017: Beatriz Sánchez (lost; 3rd place)
 2020 plebiscite: "Approve" (win)
 2021: none
 2022 plebiscite: "Approve" (lost)

References

External links
 Official website

1984 establishments in Chile
Foro de São Paulo
Chile
Chile
Left-wing politics in Chile
Libertarian socialist parties
Political parties established in 1984
Political parties disestablished in 2022
Political parties established in 2023
Political parties in Chile
Socialist parties in Chile